Bileh Hu-ye Olya (also Romanized as Bīleh Hū-ye ‘Olyā) is a village in Qalkhani Rural District, Gahvareh District, Dalahu County, Kermanshah Province, Iran. At the 2006 census, its population was 91, in 18 families.

References 

Populated places in Dalahu County